The 1994–95 English Premiership, known at the time as the 1994–95 Courage League was the eighth season of competitive rugby union in England. Each team played each other twice, in a round robin system. 

Leicester Tigers were the eventual champions, beating Bath by four points. Northampton Saints were relegated.

West Hartlepool and Sale Sharks were promoted, replacing London Irish and Newcastle Gosforth.

The 1994–95 Courage League season was the first to be shown live on Sky Sports.

Participating teams

Table

Results
The Home Team is listed in the left column.

References

External links
Official website

Premiership Rugby seasons
 
English